is a Japanese film director.

Early life 
After graduating from the University of Tokyo, Funahashi studied directing at the School of Visual Arts.

Career 
Funahashi directed Echoes in 2002. He returned with the 2005 road movie, Big River, starring Joe Odagiri, Chloe Snyder, and Kavi Raz.

His documentary film, Nuclear Nation, screened at the 62nd Berlin International Film Festival in 2012. He also directed Cold Bloom, a drama film set in Hitachi, Ibaraki, in 2013.

In 2015 he directed Nuclear Nation 2.

Filmography 
 Echoes (2002)
 Big River (2005)
 Deep in the Valley (2009)
 Nuclear Nation (2012)
 Cold Bloom (2013)
 Nuclear Nation II (2015)
 Raise Your Arms and Twist! Documentary of NMB48 (2016)
 Lovers on Borders (2018)
 Company Retreat (2020)

References

External links 
 

Japanese film directors
People from Osaka Prefecture
University of Tokyo alumni
School of Visual Arts alumni
1974 births
Living people